Hanuš Folkmann (30 December 1876 – 10 May 1936) was a Czechoslovak sculptor. His work was part of the sculpture event in the art competition at the 1932 Summer Olympics.

References

1876 births
1936 deaths
Czechoslovak sculptors
Olympic competitors in art competitions
Artists from Prague